In superconductivity, a long Josephson junction (LJJ) is a Josephson junction which has one or more dimensions longer than the Josephson penetration depth . This definition is not strict.

In terms of underlying model a short Josephson junction is characterized by the Josephson phase , which is only a function of time, but not of coordinates i.e. the Josephson junction is assumed to be point-like in space.

Simple model: the sine-Gordon equation
The simplest and the most frequently used model which describes the dynamics of the Josephson phase  in LJJ is the so-called perturbed sine-Gordon equation. For the case of 1D LJJ it looks like:

In the above equation, the r.h.s. is considered as perturbation.

Usually for theoretical studies one uses normalized sine-Gordon equation:

where spatial coordinate is normalized to the Josephson penetration depth  and time is normalized to the inverse plasma frequency . The parameter  is the dimensionless damping parameter ( is McCumber-Stewart parameter), and, finally,  is a normalized bias current.

Important solutions
 Small amplitude plasma waves. 
 Soliton (aka fluxon, Josephson vortex):

The physical velocity  is normalized to the so-called Swihart velocity , which represent a typical unit of velocity and equal to the unit of space  divided by unit of time .

References

Superconductivity
Josephson effect